Soochow University is a private university in Taipei, Taiwan. Soochow University maintains a church and a Methodist minister in residence, though it may be considered a secular institution. Soochow University is one of the most prestigious private universities in Taiwan. The university is noted for studies in comparative law and accounting.

History
The original Soochow University was founded by Methodists in Suzhou, Jiangsu, Qing dynasty in 1900 as a merger of three institutions: the Buffington Institute and the Kung Hang School in the city of Soochow (now spelled Suzhou), in Jiangsu Province, and the Anglo-Chinese College in Shanghai.

After the Chinese Civil War, members of the Soochow Alumni Association who fled to Taiwan established a new institution there in 1951. A law school was opened in 1954, and a full university was certified in 1971.

Meanwhile in Suzhou, the original university merged with the Southern Jiangsu College of Culture and Education and the Department of Mathematics and Physics at Jiangnan University to form the Jiangsu Teacher's College in 1952, which revived the name Soochow University in 1982.  However, while the English names are identical, the one in Suzhou uses the Chinese name 蘇州 (Soochow), not the original 
東吳 (Tung-wu).

The campus is home to the tomb of the prominent Chinese politician and diplomat Wang Ch'unghui, who fled to Taiwan after the establishment of the People's Republic of China in 1949.

In 2014, the Japan–Taiwan Exchange Association listed Soochow University as one of the seven well-known Taiwanese universities.

Academics

Publications 
In 1981, the first joint-issued class-made magazine, completely founded by students, called Xu Ai, appeared in Soochow University. Students voiced political opinions as to temporal society, but the magazine was quickly banned by the strong commend of the college.

However, the next year, the political students published another critical magazine, Monthly Political Magazine of Soochow University. It was banned, a result from publishing an advertisement of Shen Geng, which was a magazine of the Chinese Nationalist Party control.

On 9 September 1982, the Academic Conference of Political Department organized an audit for second year students about Taipei City Council. But the lead teacher Huang Erxuan was charged by leading a group of students to the council to listen the interpolation produced by the outside party senator. He was fired the next year.

Ranking

Excellent Long-Established University Consortium of Taiwan
Soochow University is a member of the Excellent Long-Established University Consortium of Taiwan (ELECT), which is an organization devoted to inter-school cooperation and sharing resources between schools. The twelve union universities were all founded over half a century with each of their own strengths covering professional fields of science and technology, commerce, agronomy, medicine, media, law, education, art and design, etc. These schools allow students to have multiple options, cross-domain learning and a broader adaptive development for their education.

Campus

 

Soochow University in Taiwan has two branches: a downtown branch near the Republic of China (ROC) presidential office in Taipei's Zhongzheng district and the main campus near the National Palace Museum in Taipei's Shilin district. The law and business colleges are in the downtown campus. All other colleges are located in the main campus.

Shilin Campus 
The Shilin Campus is in the mountainous terrain of the Shilin District. 

Faculty and student housing are available on the main campus although they cannot meet demand. There are three female student dorms and two male student dorms with a total occupancy of 1,500. Many students commute to campus by bus and the subway system.

Downtown Campus 
The Downtown Campus is in the Zhongzheng District.

Organization
Taiwan's first private university is headed by a president and a board of trustees. The University is divided into six schools or colleges, each having a variety of departments:

School of Arts and Social Science
Department of Chinese Literature
Department of History
Department of Philosophy
Department of Political Science
Department of Sociology
Department of Social Work
Department of Music
Center for Teacher Education

School of Foreign Language and Culture
Department of English Language and Literature
Department of Japanese Language and Literature
Department of German Language and Literature
Language Center

School of Science
Department of Mathematics
Department of Physics
Department of Chemistry
Department of Microbiology
Department of Psychology

School of Law

School of Business
Department of Economics
Department of Accounting
Department of Business Administration
Department of International Business
Department of Computer and Information Science
Undergraduate Program of Business

School of Big Data Management

Sports
Sports play an important role in campus life. The downtown campus has tennis and basketball courts. The main campus has indoor and outdoor basketball courts, tennis courts, a race track, a mini rock climbing wall, and a field that is used for softball and soccer. Each year the university holds two major student athletic events.

Much of the sports facilities on the main campus are on land owned by the Taipei city government rather than by the university. The city government has considered reclaiming the land to build an expressway but has decided to back off with this project.

Clubs
The university has 183 student clubs or societies, such as Association for Diplomacy Research (SCU A.D.R.).

Traditions

24-hour International Ultramarathon: Runners from several countries, students, faculty, and celebrities such as Ryoichi Sekiya and Mami Kudo participate in this annual event. Only very few of the contestants venture running for the entire duration of the marathon. Portable toilets are set up near the race track with one or two toilets reserved for certain internationally renowned runners. Some spectators set up tents near the track and camp the entire night watching the marathon.
Campus Christmas Carol: Students from the music department visit the faculty residential apartment complexes sing Christmas carols on Christmas Eve. Having people singing carols in the neighborhood is a rare sight in Taiwan since Christians make up a small minority of the population.

Notable alumni
 Chen Chih-ching, Minister of Council of Agriculture (2016)
 Han Kuo-yu, mayor of Kaohsiung
 Jeffrey Koo Sr. (1957), businessman
 John Chiang, Vice Chairperson of Kuomintang (2008-2014)
 John Deng, Minister of Economic Affairs (2014-2016)
 Kevin Chu, film director
 Mandy Wei, actress, model and host
 Shih Jun-ji, Vice Premier of the Republic of China
 Chiang Wei-kuo, Son of Chiang Kai-Shek
 Shyu Jong-shyong, Deputy Secretary-General of Executive Yuan (2015-2016)
 Sun Lih-chyun, spokesperson of Executive Yuan
 Tseng Chung-ming, Deputy Minister of Health and Welfare (2013-2015)
 Winston Chang, President of the Soochow University (1992–1996)
 Bai Pei-ying, Minister of Finance (1992–1993); Board Chairman of the Chung Yuan Christian University
 Cheng Chung-mo, Taiwan Grand Justice and Vice President of the Judicial Yuan (1999–2006)
 Chou Chih-P'ing, Professor of East Asia Studies, Princeton University, U.S.
 Chang Chien-Chi, well-known photographer; Winner of the W. Eugene Smith Grant in Humanistic Photography (1999); member of the Magnum Photos agency, New York
 Lee Choa-hsiu, President of the Tainan National University of the Arts (2007–), and at the age of 42, was the country's youngest national university president.
 Frank C.J. Liu., Former Franklin Templeton Investments chief representative for China and President of Franklin Templeton Investments (Taiwan).
 Liu San-chi, President of the Yu Da College of Business; Former Minister of the Directorate General of Budget, Accounting and Statistics (DGBAS) of Executive Yuan, Taiwan
 Hsu Shu-hsiang, President of the Transworld Institute of Technology (2006–)
 Lu Reng-kong, Chairman of the Da An Commercial Bank; Former Taiwan Finance Minister (1984–1985)
 Shieh Jhy-wey, Taiwan's Representative to Germany (Taipeh Vertretung in der Bundesrepublik Deutschland; 2005.5 –); Dean of the School of Foreign Languages of Soochow University (1996–2002)
 Tu Yin-tzyong, Chairman of the Citigroup Global Markets Taiwan Ltd; Executive Vice President of the Goldman Sachs Group, New York
 Members of the Legislative Yuan: Chang Hung-lu, Chang Show-foong, Hung Chao-nan; Chang Ching-fang; Hsu Chung-hsiung; Cheng Kuei-lien; Lin Hsu Shao-ping; Cheng San-yuan; Hsu Yuan-kuo

School presidents
 (1901–1911)
John W. Cline (1911–1922)
Walter B. Nance (1922–1927)
 (1927–1949)
 (1951–1952)
Shih Jiyan (1952–1954)
Chen Ting-ruei (1954–1955)
 (1955–1957)
 (1957–1968)
 (1968–1969)
 (1969–1983)
Edward Yang (1983–1992)
Winston Chang (1992–1996)
 (1996–2004)
Liu Chao-shiuan (2004–2008)
Huang Chen-tai (2008–2011)
Pan Wei-ta (since 2012)

Noted faculty
 Winston Chang
 Liu Chao-shiuan: former president of the university and former Premier of the Republic of China

See also
List of universities in Taiwan
U12 Consortium

References

External links

Official site

 
Private universities and colleges in Taiwan
Educational institutions established in 1951
Association of Christian Universities and Colleges in Asia
1951 establishments in Taiwan
Universities and colleges in Taiwan
Universities and colleges in Taipei
Comprehensive universities in Taiwan